Rekhtin Maxim  (born 9 June 1994) - is a Kazakhstan athlete, dancer, journalist, presenter, and blogger. He is "Champion of the Republic of Kazakhstan", "Master of Sports of the Republic of Kazakhstan", member of two World Championship teams (2009, 2011), "Asian Championships Finalist" (2010) – in sport (ballroom) dancing. As  journalist he interviewed many Kazakh, Russian and international celebrities. He created the online video project of Dance Sport Federation of Kazakhstan and a video blog.

Recognition 

Best Host 2007, 2008, 2009, 2012 – "The Almaty Festival of Arts of Youth"
Bronze medal Republic of Kazakhstan" (three times) – in sport dancing.
Vice-Champion of the Republic of Kazakhstan (three times) – in sport dancing.
Dancer of the year of the Republic of Kazakhstan 2009 (Juniors 2, Standard) – in sport dancing.
Champion of the Republic of Kazakhstan – in sport dancing.
Winner, Open Championship of the Kyrgyz Republic" – in sport dancing.
Finalist, The Asia Championship – in sport dancing.
Candidate for Master of Sports of the Republic of Kazakhstan – in sport dancing (equates to nationally ranked dancer).
Master of Sports of the Republic of Kazakhstan – in sport dancing (equates to national champion).

Sporting achievements

References 

1994 births
Living people